The 2021 season for  was the team's 38th season overall and the third season under the current name. The team has been a UCI WorldTeam since 2005, when the tier was first established. Ahead of the season, the team changed bicycle sponsor, as Canadian manufacturer Cervélo replaced Italian manufacturer Bianchi, which had been used by the team since 2014; the team also changed from rim brakes to disc brakes.

Team roster 

Riders who joined the team for the 2021 season

Riders who left the team during or after the 2020 season

Season victories

National, Continental, and World Champions

Notes

References

External links 

 

Team Jumbo–Visma men
2021
Team Jumbo–Visma men